Montfortia is a genus of sea snails, marine gastropod mollusks in the family Fissurellidae, the keyhole limpets and slit limpets.

Species
Species within the genus Montfortia include:
 Montfortia emarginata (Blainville, 1825)
 Montfortia hermosa (Lowe, 1935)
 Montfortia picta (Dunker, 1860)
 Montfortia polygonalis (A. Adams, 1852)
 Montfortia pulchra (A. Adams, 1852)
 Montfortia subemarginata (Blainville, 1819)

The following species were brought into synonymy:
 Montfortia excentrica Iredale, 1929: synonym of Montfortista excentrica (Iredale, 1929)
 Montfortia kirana Habe, 1963: synonym of Montfortista kirana (Habe, 1963)
 Montfortia panhi (Quoy & Gaimard, 1834): synonym of Montfortista panhi (Quoy & Gaimard, 1834)

References

External links
 To World Register of Marine Species
 Récluz, C. A. (1843). Catalogue descriptif de plusieurs nouvelles espèces de coquilles de France suivi d'observations sur quelques autres. Revue zoologique, par la Société Cuvierienne. 6: 5-12, 104-112, 228-238, 257-261

Fissurellidae
Gastropod genera